The men's pommel horse event was part of the gymnastics programme at the 1924 Summer Olympics. It was one of nine gymnastics events and it was contested for the third time after 1896 and 1904. The competition was held on Wednesday, July 23, 1924. Seventy gymnasts from nine nations competed, with each nation having an 8-gymnast team (with 2 non-starters). The event was won by Josef Wilhelm of Switzerland, the nation's second victory in the event (after 1896). With Swiss gymnasts Jean Gutweninger and Antoine Rebetez taking silver and bronze, respectively, it was the second consecutive appearance of the event in which the event's medals were swept (United States, 1904).

Background

This was the third appearance of the event, which is one of the five apparatus events held every time there were apparatus events at the Summer Olympics (no apparatus events were held in 1900, 1908, 1912, or 1920). The reigning (1922) world champion was Miroslav Klinger of Czechoslovakia.

Two nations were competing in the event for the second time: Switzerland had previously competed in 1896 and the United States had competed in 1904. The other seven nations (Czechoslovakia, Finland, France, Great Britain, Italy, Luxembourg, and Yugoslavia) were competing for the first time.

Competition format

Each gymnast performed a compulsory exercise and a voluntary exercise. These two exercises were 2 of the 11 components of the individual all-around score, and thus were also included in the team all-around score. Each exercise had a maximum possible score of 11, with half a point each for the approach and dismount and up to 10 points for the routine.

Schedule

Results

References

Official Olympic Report
 

Pommel horse
Men's 1924